147th Brigade may refer to:

 147th Mixed Brigade (Spain)
 147th Infantry Brigade (United Kingdom)